Borzykowo may refer to the following places:
Borzykowo, Pomeranian Voivodeship (north Poland)
Borzykowo, Greater Poland Voivodeship (west-central Poland)